This article is a list of diseases of red clover (Trifolium pratense).

Bacterial diseases

Fungal diseases

Nematodes, parasitic

Viral diseases

References
Common Names of Diseases, The American Phytopathological Society

Red clover
Trifolium